Landesmuseum (‘state museum’) may refer to a museum of a state of Germany or a state of Austria:

Hessisches Landesmuseum Darmstadt, Germany
Landesmuseum Mainz, Germany
Landesmuseum Württemberg, Germany
Landesmuseum Hannover, Germany
Pomerania State Museum, Greifswald, Germany
Rheinisches Landesmuseum, Rhineland, Germany
Rheinisches Landesmuseum Bonn
Rheinisches Landesmuseum Trier
State Museum for Work and Technology, Mannheim, Germany
Swiss National Museum, Zürich, Switzerland
Universalmuseum Joanneum, Styria, Austria (formerly the Landesmuseum Joanneum)
vorarlberg museum (former Vorarlberger Landesmuseum), Bregenz, Austria
Westphalian State Museum of Art and Cultural History, Münster, Germany